Sixten, Sigsten or Sighsten is a masculine given name of Swedish origin. It is earliest attested in a runestone as sikstain. People named Sixten include:

Sixten Boström (born 1963), Finnish football player and manager
Sixten Ehrling (1918–2005), Swedish conductor
Sixten Franzén (1919–2008), Swedish scientist, inventor of pointcytology
Sighsten Herrgård (1943–1989), Finnish-born Swedish fashion designer
Sixten Isberg (1921–2012), Swedish alpine skier
Sixten Jansson (1913–2006), Swedish canoeist
Sixten Jernberg (1929–2012), Swedish cross-country skier
Sixten Johansson (1910–1991), Swedish ski jumper
Sixten Larsson (1918–1995), Swedish track athlete
Sixten Mohlin (born 1996), Swedish footballer
Sixten Kai Nielsen (born 1978), Danish artist
Sixten Korkman (born 1948), Finnish economist
Sixten Ringbom (1935–1992), Finnish art historian
Sixten Sason (1912–1967), Swedish industrial designer
Sixten Sild (born 1964), Estonian orienteer
Sixten Sparre (1854–1889), Swedish dragoon lieutenant
Sixten Sundström (1897–1960), Swedish track and field athlete
Sixten Veit (born 1970), German football player
Sixten Wackström (born 1960), Finnish cyclist

See also
Fredrik Sixten (born 1962), Swedish composer, organist and conductor
Sven Sixten (1929–2001), Swedish priest, author and poet

References 

Swedish masculine given names